Juniperus drupacea, the Syrian juniper, is a species of juniper native to the eastern Mediterranean region from southern Greece (Parnon Oros, Peloponnese), southern Turkey, western Syria, and Lebanon, growing on rocky sites from  in altitude. The species is the sole member of Juniperus sect. Caryocedrus., which is sometimes recognised as genus Arceuthos.

Description
It is usually dioecious, with separate male and female plants.

The three apical scales each bear a single seed, but with the three seeds fused together into a single nut-like shell. The male cones are produced in clusters (unlike any other juniper) of 5–20 cones together, yellow, 3–4 mm long, and fall soon after shedding their pollen in early spring.

Taxonomy
Because of its distinct cones with the seeds fused three together and the clustered male cones, it has sometimes been treated in a distinct genus of its own as Arceuthos drupacea (Labill.) Antoine & Kotschy, but genetic studies have shown it is fairly closely related to J. macrocarpa and J. oxycedrus.

References

External links
Arboretum de Villardebelle photos of cones & shoots
Conifers Around the World: Juniperus drupacea - Syrian Juniper.

drupacea
Trees of Mediterranean climate
Dioecious plants